The Raven Cliffs Wilderness was designated in 1986 and currently consists of . The Wilderness is located within the borders of the Chattahoochee National Forest in White, Lumpkin, and Union Counties, Georgia. The Wilderness is managed by the United States Forest Service and is part of the National Wilderness Preservation System.

Logged in the early to mid-1900s, the forest has recovered with dense hardwoods and scattered pines, most of which have now celebrated their 60th birthday. Approximately  of trout streams, including Boggs Creek, attract many anglers and there is also abundant wildlife. The Raven Cliff Falls and Raven Cliffs Scenic Area are also big attractions.

References

IUCN Category Ib
Protected areas of the Appalachians
Protected areas of Lumpkin County, Georgia
Protected areas of Union County, Georgia
Protected areas of White County, Georgia
Wilderness areas of Georgia (U.S. state)
Protected areas established in 1986
Chattahoochee-Oconee National Forest
1986 establishments in Georgia (U.S. state)